Nisha Ali (born 9 August 1986) is an Indian-born cricketer who plays for the United Arab Emirates national cricket team. 
In July 2018, she was named in the United Arab Emirates' squad for the 2018 ICC Women's World Twenty20 Qualifier tournament. She made her WT20I debut against Netherlands on 7 July 2018.

References

External links
 

1996 births
Living people
Emirati women cricketers
United Arab Emirates women Twenty20 International cricketers
Indian emigrants to the United Arab Emirates
Indian expatriate sportspeople in the United Arab Emirates
People from Bhopal
Sportswomen from Madhya Pradesh